The 1960 Tipperary Senior Hurling Championship was the 70th staging of the Tipperary Senior Hurling Championship since its establishment by the Tipperary County Board in 1887.

Thurles Sarsfields were the defending champions.

On 16 October 1960, Toomevara won the championship after a 3-15 to 2-08 defeat of Thurles Sarsfields in the final. It was their 10th championship title overall and their first title since 1931.

Results

Final

References

Tipperary
Tipperary Senior Hurling Championship